Xochihuehuetlan  is a city and seat of the municipality of Xochihuehuetlan, in the state of Guerrero, south-western Mexico.

Climate

References

Populated places in Guerrero